The 2017 World Junior B Curling Championships was held from January 3 to 10 at the Östersund Arena in Östersund, Sweden. The top three men’s and women’s teams at the World Junior B Curling Championships would qualify for the 2017 World Junior Curling Championships.

Men

Round-robin standings
Final Round Robin Standings

Tiebreaker Games
January 9, 08:00

Qualification Game
January 9, 12:00

Playoffs

Quarterfinals
January 9, 16:00

Semifinals
January 10, 9:00

Bronze-medal game
January 10, 14:00

Gold-medal game
January 10, 14:00

Women

Round-robin standings
Final Round Robin Standings

Tiebreaker Games
January 9, 8:00

Qualification Game
January 9, 12:00

Playoffs

Quarterfinals
January 9, 20:00

Semifinals
January 10, 9:00

Bronze-medal game
January 10, 14:00

Gold-medal game
January 10, 14:00

References

External links
Men's results - WCF
Women's results - WCF
Men's results book
Women's results book 

 
2017 in curling
International curling competitions hosted by Sweden
Sports competitions in Östersund
2017 in Swedish sport
Curling
2017
January 2017 sports events in Europe